Neshannock Creek is a  long tributary to Shenango River that forms at the confluence of Cool Spring and Otter Creek in Mercer County and then flows south to Lawrence County, Pennsylvania.  This creek is known for its fly fishing at Volant, Pennsylvania.

Neshannock is a Native American name purported to mean "double stream".

Course
Neshannock Creek begins at the confluence of Cool Spring and Otter Creeks just east of Mercer, Pennsylvania.  The creek then flows south to join the Shenango River at New Castle, Pennsylvania.

Watershed
Neshannock Creek drains  of area, receives about 41.3 in/year of precipitation, has a wetness index of 466.95 and is about 41% forested.

Tributaries

References

Rivers of Lawrence County, Pennsylvania
Rivers of Mercer County, Pennsylvania
Rivers of Pennsylvania
Tributaries of the Beaver River